The ABC Dragonfly was a British radial engine developed towards the end of the First World War. It was expected to deliver excellent performance for the time and was ordered in very large numbers. It proved, however, to be extremely unreliable and was abandoned when its faults were unable to be corrected.

Design and development
ABC Motors was founded in 1911 by Granville Bradshaw, who was also the company's chief designer. In 1917, after initial promising tests of the ABC Wasp air-cooled radial, Bradshaw produced a design for a larger and more powerful engine, the nine-cylinder Dragonfly. The engine was simple and easy to produce, and was predicted to give 340 hp (254 kW) for a weight of 600 lb (273 kg). One distinctive feature was the use of copper-plated cooling fins, which were claimed by Bradshaw to be so effective that water would not boil on the surface of the radiators.

On the basis of the promised performance, Sir William Weir, the Director of Aeronautical Supplies, made the decision to place large orders for the Dragonfly, with 11,500 engines having been ordered from 13 suppliers by June 1918. It was planned that the bulk of RAF aircraft would be powered by the Dragonfly in 1919. Types designed to be powered by the big nine cylinder included the Sopwith Dragon (a derivative of the existing Snipe), the Nieuport Nighthawk, and the Siddeley Siskin. Of this order 1,147 engines were built, but only nine or ten actually flew.

The engine was described in brief by aviation journalist Bill Gunston in his book, 'Plane Speaking' in the chapter headed, 'Cancel the Others...' In this he suggested that Bradshaw had proved to be a better salesman than a designer, and had proved non-committal when asked about initial testing which was ultimately to reveal severe problems with the much-vaunted engine.

Already 30 kg over its designed weight as built, Dragonfly was subject to severe overheating. Gunston referred to it as the worst cooled aero engine ever made. The copper-plated cooling fins proved useless; the cylinder heads tended to glow a dull red at operational speeds, and in extreme cases caused heat damage and even charring to the propeller. Developed power fell far short of estimates even when the engine was run at 15 percent over-speed (producing only 315 hp ) and it showed much poorer fuel consumption than expected. Attempts to improve cooling with cylinder redesign were marginally successful, but the death blow fell when it was realized that the engine was designed to run at the torsional resonance frequency of its own crankshaft, causing severe vibration, a little known condition at the time. These problems proved unsolvable, resulting in an absurdly low service life (around 30 to 35 hours per engine), and the Dragonfly was eventually abandoned.

Gunston's observations suggested that it had been as well that the Armistice had been signed in 1918, as the only other aero engine still in production at that time was the Rolls-Royce Eagle; all other types having been cancelled in favour of the untested Dragonfly.

Variants
Dragonfly I
1918, 320 hp (239 kW)
Dragonfly IA
360 hp (268 kW), revised pistons and cylinder heads, revised oil system.

Applications

Armstrong Whitworth Ara
Austin Greyhound
Avro 533 Manchester
BAT Basilisk
Boulton Paul Bourges
Bristol Badger
de Havilland DH.11 Oxford
Nieuport Nighthawk
Nieuport London
Siddeley Siskin
Sopwith Bulldog
Sopwith Cobham
Sopwith Rainbow
Sopwith Dragon
Sopwith Snark
Sopwith Snapper
Westland Weasel

Specifications (Dragonfly IA)

See also
 Lawrance J-1, contemporary American nine-cylinder radial (1921), direct ancestor of the Wright Whirlwind series of "golden age" American aviation radials.

References

Notes

Bibliography

 Bruce, J.M. "Sopwith Snipe...:...the RAF's First Fighter. (Part 2). " Air Enthusiast International Volume 6 Number 6, June 1974. Bromley, UK: Fine Scroll.
 Grey, C.G. (ed.). Jane's Fighting Aircraft of World War I. London, Studio, 1990. .
 Gunston, Bill. World Encyclopedia of Aero Engines. London: Guild Publishing, 1986.
 Lumsden, Alec. British Piston Engines and their Aircraft. Marlborough, Wiltshire: Airlife Publishing, 2003. .

1910s aircraft piston engines
Dragonfly
Aircraft air-cooled radial piston engines